Sheep and Wool Festival may refer to:

 Maryland Sheep and Wool Festival
 New York State Sheep and Wool Festival